Il Balletto di Bronzo (translation: "The Bronze Ballet") is an Italian progressive rock band from Naples. The band was initially formed as the I Battitori Selvaggi, and played Nato bases in Italy. Early members included Rafaele Cascone, a progressive guitarist and Freddy Cannon on drums. Cannon would later become a very successful record company executive with EMI, Carrere, PWL and join BMI as a senior executive in 1994. They changed their name to Il Balletto di Bronzo in 1969 and released two singles, Neve Calda / Comincio 'Per Gioco (1969) and Si, Mama Mama / Meditazione (1970). The albums Sirio 2222 and Ys followed, before they before disbanded in 1973.

History
Sirio 2222 (1970) is a psychedelic album originally released on RCA Italiana. The line-up of the band at this time was Marco Cecioni (vocals, guitar), Lino Ajello (guitar), Michele Cupaiuolo (bass) and Giancarlo Stinga (drums). "Ti risveglierai con me", a track from the album, plays over the end credits for the 1970 film Five Dolls for an August Moon.

In 1971 both Cecioni and Cupaiuolo left the band, replaced by Gianni Leone (vocals, keyboards), from the band Città Frontale, and Vito Manzari (bass), formerly of Rome's Quelle Strane Cose Che. This line-up released Ys in 1972 on Polydor, one of the most acclaimed examples of Italian symphonic rock. Written by Leone, Ys is a concept album based on the legend of Ys, a lost French city. The album is divided into four parts: "Introduzione", "Primo Incontro", "Secondo Incontro" and "Terzo Incontro ed Epilogo".

The band released more singles, including La tua casa comoda/Donna Vittoria. Over the years, several rarities, including previously unreleased English and Spanish language singles, have surfaced. Some of these were collected on the 1990 release Il Re Del Castello.

Despite breaking up in the early 1970s, Il Balletto di Bronzo continued to exert an influence, mostly on the strength of their second album. Several bands, amongst them Nurse With Wound, have cited them as an influence: The band is on the Nurse With Wound list. The album Ys has been reissued at different times in Italy, Korea and Japan.

In the late 1990s, Gianni Leone reformed the band as a trio, recording the live album Trys. This incarnation of the band toured with a rotating roster, Leone being the sole constant.

In 2013 Lino Ajello and Marco Cecioni reformed the band but the name "Balletto di Bronzo" continues to belong to the prog trio of Gianni Leone who however, participated in the recording of "CUMA 2016 DC". After 40 years, the 3 historical elements of  "Balletto di Bronzo" are again reunited for this recording project "CUMA 2016 D.C."

Discography

Albums
 1970 - Sirio 2222, RCA Italiana
 1972 - Ys, Polydor
 2016 - Cuma 2016 D.C., Suoni Del Sud / No Music No Life

Singles
 1969 - Neve calda/Cominciò per gioco, AEC/RCA
 1970 - Sì, mama mama/Meditazione, RCA Italiana
 1973 - La tua casa comoda/Donna Vittoria, Polydor

Live
 1999 - Trys, Mellow Music

Compilations
 1990 - Il re del castello, RCA Raro! (early singles)

See also 
Il Banco del Mutuo Soccorso
Cervello
La Locanda delle Fate
Le Orme
Osanna
Nova
La Premiata Forneria Marconi
Il Rovescio della Medaglia

References

 Enzo Giannelli. "Balletto di Bronzo". Gino Castaldo (edited by). Dizionario della canzone italiana. Curcio Editore, 1990.

External link

Italian progressive rock groups